"Happy Hour" is the twenty-first episode of the sixth season of the American comedy series The Office and the show's 121st episode overall. It originally aired March 25, 2010 on NBC.

In the episode, Oscar arranges a happy hour with the warehouse staff so he can flirt with Matt. Pam is excited to see the staff and brings a date for Michael, but Michael turns into an alter ego named "Date Mike" who catches the eye of the bar manager. Meanwhile, Andy and Erin have begun a relationship but are keeping it a secret to avoid drama. Dwight rethinks his pre-natal contract with Angela after he sees Isabel again.

It was written by B. J. Novak and directed by Matt Sohn. "Happy Hour" got positive reviews, however, according to Nielsen ratings, the episode was viewed by 7.28 million viewers coming third in its timeslot and falling 3% from last week and becoming the lowest rated episode of the season.

Synopsis
In the cold open, Michael Scott (Steve Carell) is doing push-ups, and agrees to let anyone who beats his record of "25 and one 'girl push up'" go home early. Most of the office fails and Stanley Hudson (Leslie David Baker) is the only person to succeed. Oscar Martinez (Oscar Nunez) likens it to "one of those stories where a mother lifts a car to save her baby." Though annoyed at first, Michael eventually starts cheering for Stanley and applauds with the rest of the office when Stanley leaves for the day.

Wanting to spend more time with the new warehouse worker Matt (Sam Daly), Oscar asks Darryl Philbin (Craig Robinson) to organize a happy hour outing between the office employees and the warehouse workers. Jim Halpert (John Krasinski) invites Pam Halpert (Jenna Fischer), who is unusually excited to see everyone. They invite a friend of hers, Julie (Laurie Naughton Okin), to meet Michael. Julie seems to take a liking to Michael as she laughs at everything he says, but when Michael learns they invited Julie specifically for him, he adopts a new persona called "Date Mike" that he says is inspired by the winners and losers of reality TV dating shows and starts acting erratic and unpredictable. He causes a scene to the point where the manager, Donna (Amy Pietz), threatens to throw him out. Michael initially stands down, but then decides to confront Donna about what happened. The two end up hitting it off and she offers him a free lunch at the bar. Julie notices this and leaves.

Andy Bernard (Ed Helms) and Erin Hannon (Ellie Kemper) do their best to keep their relationship under wraps because of the drama it might bring if they go public, even though everyone seems to know already. They first try to keep their distance from each other. They then attempt to flirt with other bar patrons, but when Erin takes the flirting too far, they end up having an argument in the photo booth. Realizing that hiding their relationship has caused too much drama, Andy publicly announces their relationship on the PA system.

Dwight Schrute (Rainn Wilson) rethinks his pre-natal contract with Angela Martin (Angela Kinsey) when Isabel (Kelen Coleman) arrives at the bar. Dwight and Isabel have fun playing Whac-A-Mole together while Angela tries to get in on the fun. Dwight thinks that Isabel would be better suited to have his children, so he tells Angela he is canceling the contract, prompting Angela to get a summons to court. When she confronts Dwight about the contract in front of Isabel, Isabel "whacks" Angela on the head and scares her off. Dwight gives Isabel a passionate kiss afterward.

On a couple of occasions, Kevin indulges his bad-taste humor by making baby-crying noises near Pam, hoping the sound will cause her nipples to leak milk. It does not work, but later when Kelly Kapoor (Mindy Kaling) comes past weeping, it suddenly does.

Oscar is upset that Matt did not show up with the rest of them, prompting Darryl to tell Oscar that they have nothing in common, but when Matt finally shows up, Oscar gets excited and the two shoot hoops together. At the end of the episode, Darryl asks the long-working yet newly featured Japanese warehouse worker, Hide, to recount his story about how he used to be a heart surgeon. Hide explains how he failed a heart operation on a Yakuza boss, prompting him to flee to the United States, where Darryl gave him a job. After doing so, Hide then reveals that he failed that heart operation purposely, claiming that he is "good surgeon".

Production
The episode is written by B. J. Novak, his first writing credit for the season and directed by Matt Sohn, his first directing credit of the season.

Reception
In its original American broadcast, "Happy Hour" was watched by 7.28 million viewers, with a 3.5 rating and a 10 share in the 18–49 demographic.

The episode received positive reviews. Dan Phillips of IGN gave the episode an 8 saying it was "impressive" and "In the end, there were enough laughs to be had from most of the main love connections and quick asides to call 'Happy Hour' a success – even if the jokes weren't all necessarily fresh." Darren Fanich of Entertainment Weekly gave the episode a positive review saying "Did you like 'Happy Hour,' viewers? It’s usually a bad sign when sitcoms hit the point where everybody falls in love with everyone else, but to me, every romance on The Office feels realistic and weird in its own specific way." Nathan Rabin of The A.V. Club gave the episode a B+ saying "Yes, tonight was just like Valentine’s Day only not terrible. Actually, it was nothing like Valentine’s Day except that it involved love and a large ensemble." Joel Keller of the TV Squad gave the episode a positive review saying "But you know what I'm getting at. The tone, pacing, and comedy of this episode continues the recent trend of The Office getting back to what made people love it to begin with. And, yes, part of that means that Michael is going to make an ass of himself. But at least the season six version of Michael somehow gets a little bit of hope mixed in with his desperation stew." Alan Sepinwall of The Star-Ledger gave the episode a mixed review said "Overall, though, I'd say the good outweighed the bad in this one, but just barely". On the OfficeTally, the episode got an 8.43/10.

References

External links
 "Happy Hour" at NBC.com
 

2010 American television episodes
The Office (American season 6) episodes